Manju Tyagi is an Indian politician and a member of 17th Legislative Assembly, Uttar Pradesh of India. She represents the ‘Sri Nagar’ constituency in Lakhimpur district of Uttar Pradesh.

Political career
Tyagi contested Uttar Pradesh Assembly Election as Bharatiya Janata Party candidate and defeated her close contestant Meera Bano from Samajwadi Party with a margin of 54,939 votes.

Posts held

References

Uttar Pradesh MLAs 2017–2022
Year of birth missing (living people)
Living people
Bharatiya Janata Party politicians from Uttar Pradesh
Uttar Pradesh MLAs 2022–2027